The Mixed team competition at the 2018 World Judo Championships was held on 27 September 2018.

Results

Finals

Repechage

Pool A

Pool B

Pool C

Pool D

Prize money
The sums listed bring the total prizes awarded to 57,000€ for the individual event.

References

External links
 
 Draw

Team
World Mixed Team Judo Championships
World 2018